IQM may refer to:

 IQM (Computers), a Finnish-German quantum computer manufacturer
 Interquartile mean, a statistical measure
 IATA code for Qiemo Yudu Airport, China
 former IATA code for Qiemo Airport (former)